Carrington and Carington are surnames originating from one of the Carringtons in England, or from the town of Carentan in Normandy, France. It is also rarely a given name.

Surname

Scientists
Alan Carrington (1934–2013), British chemist
Benjamin Carrington (1827–1893), British botanist
Richard Christopher Carrington (1826–1875), British astronomer

Soldiers, politicians, diplomats and jurists
Charles Carrington (British Army officer) (1897–1990), soldier, professor, and biographer of Rudyard Kipling
Codrington Edmund Carrington (1769–1849), English barrister, 1st Chief Justice of Ceylon and Member of Parliament
Edward Carrington (1748–1810), American soldier and statesman
Edwin Carrington, ambassador to and former Secretary-General of the Caribbean Community (1992-2010) from Trinidad and Tobago
Harold Carrington (1882-1964) British Army General
Henry B. Carrington (1824–1912), American Civil War brigadier general, lawyer, professor and author
James M. Carrington (1904–1995), American politician
John Carrington (judge) (1847–1913), British jurist, Solicitor General of Barbados, Chief Justice of St Lucia and Tobago, Attorney General of British Guiana and Chief Justice of Hong Kong 
John H. Carrington (born 1934), American politician
Matthew Carrington, Baron Carrington of Fulham (born 1947), British politician
Paul Carrington (judge) (1733–c. 1826), American appellate judge
Peter Carington, 6th Baron Carrington (1919–2018), British former politician and Secretary-General of NATO
Robert Carrington, 2nd Baron Carrington (1796–1868), British politician
Rupert Carington, 4th Baron Carrington (1852–1929), British politician
Walter Carrington (1930–2020), American diplomat and ambassador
William Carington (1845–1914), British soldier, politician and courtier

Religious figures
Albert Carrington, (1813–1889), American apostle and member of the Quorum of the Twelve Apostles in The Church of Jesus Christ of Latter-day Saints
John F. Carrington (1914–1985), English missionary and expert on drum language
Philip Carrington (1892–1975), Anglican priest and author, Bishop of Quebec and Metropolitan of Canada
Vernon Carrington (1936–2005), Jamaican religious leader, founder of the Twelve Tribes of Israel branch of the Rastafari movement

Artists and entertainers
Chuck Carrington (born 1968), American actor
Debbie Lee Carrington (1959–2018), American actress and stuntwoman
Desmond Carrington (1926–2017), British radio personality and actor
Dora Carrington or simply "Carrington" (1893–1932), British artist
Elaine Sterne Carrington (1891–1958), American screenwriter, playwright, novelist and short story author
Joanna Carrington (1931–2003), British artist
Leonora Carrington (1917–2011), English-Mexican artist and novelist
Michael Carrington (voice actor), American comic writer and voice actor
Nicholas Toms Carrington (1777–1830), English poet
Rebecca Carrington (born 1971), British musician and comedian
Rodney Carrington (born 1968), American stand-up comic, actor and musician
Terri Lyne Carrington (born 1965), American jazz drummer, composer, singer, record producer and entrepreneur
Raymond C. Carrington (born 1930) American sculptor

Athletes
Bob Carrington (born 1953), American former National Basketball Association player
Darren Carrington (born 1966), American former National Football League player
Elijah Carrington (1914–1998), English cricketer
Lisa Carrington (born 1989), New Zealand sprint canoeist, two-time Olympic champion
Mark Carrington (cricketer) (born 1961), New Zealand former cricketer
Mark Carrington (footballer) (born 1987), English footballer
Paul Carrington (American football) (born 1982), American former National Football League player

In media
Fitzroy Carrington (1869–1954), English-American editor
Hereward Carrington (1880-1958), British author and investigator of spiritualism
Michael Carrington (television executive) (born 1961), Australian broadcast executive
Tom Carrington (illustrator) (1843–1918), journalist, political cartoonist and illustrator in colonial Australia
Jim Carrington (children's author), (born 1977)

Other
Dorothy Carrington (1910–2002), expatriate British writer about and scholar of Corsica
Edith Carrington (1853–1929), English animal rights activist and writer
Kelly Carrington, American model
Matthew Carrington (1983–2005), student killed during a hazing incident, prompting Matt's Law
Roger Clifford Carrington (1906 – 1971), classical scholar, archaeologist and teacher.

Pen name
Charles Carrington (1867–1921), British publisher of erotic literature born Paul Harry Ferdinando
Tori Carrington, American writing team of romance novels

Fictional characters
Carrington family, core family of the American soap opera Dynasty
Adam Carrington
Alexis Carrington
Amanda Carrington
Ben Carrington
Blake Carrington
Claudia Carrington
Dana Waring Carrington
Danny Carrington
Fallon Carrington
Krystina Carrington
Krystle Carrington
Leslie Carrington
Sammy Jo Carrington
Steven Carrington
Tom Carrington
Arthur Carrington, in the 1951 science-fiction movie The Thing From Another World
Daniel Carrington, in the video game franchise Perfect Dark
Mayor Carrington, in the 1993 television series Mighty Morphin Power Rangers
Michael Carrington, in the 1982 movie Grease 2

Given name
Carrington Garland (born 1964), American actress
Carrington T. Marshall (1869–1958), American lawyer, Chief Justice of the Ohio Supreme Court and a judge at the Nuremberg Trials
Carrington Smedley (1808–1895), politician in the colony of South Australia
C. B. Williams (1889–1991), British entomologist

See also
Charles Wynn-Carington, 1st Marquess of Lincolnshire (1843–1928), British politician, Governor of New South Wales

English-language surnames
English toponymic surnames
English given names